Bruno Alexandre Sutter de Lima (born June 13, 1979) is a Brazilian singer-songwriter, bassist, record producer, actor, humorist, YouTuber, and television music and talent competition judge. He is famous for being a founding member of the comedy troupe Hermes & Renato, and under the alias Detonator he fronts the parodic heavy metal projects Massacration and Detonator e as Musas do Metal.

Biography

Sutter was born in Petrópolis on June 13, 1979, and began his career as an entertainer at churrascarias singing covers of famous songs. In 1999 he founded Hermes & Renato alongside his friends Marco Antônio Alves, Fausto Fanti, Adriano Silva and Felipe Torres; known for their off-color humor, frequently reliant on pop culture references, they amassed a strong cult following throughout the late 1990s/early to mid-2000s during their tenure on MTV Brasil. Sutter was famous for playing, among others, Detonator, the lead singer of comedy band Massacration, which would eventually spawn off to release their own albums and singles. When Hermes & Renato parted ways with MTV to join RecordTV in 2010, changing their name to "Banana Mecânica", Sutter stayed with the group until 2012, when he left to re-join MTV on his own; there he would host the rock-oriented variety show Rocka Rolla and the satirical newscast Furo MTV. When MTV Brasil went defunct in 2013, he founded alongside Marcelo Adnet and Tatá Werneck the YouTube channel Amada Foca, and got his own radio talk show, Bem que se Kiss, in 2014, broadcast by Kiss FM.

In 2012 Sutter put Massacration on hold to form another musical project based around his "Detonator" persona, Detonator e as Musas do Metal; their debut album, the rock opera Metal Folclore: The Zoeira Never Ends..., came out in 2014 and counts with guest appearances by Alexandre Frota as the narrator, musicians João Gordo, Rafael Bittencourt, Felipe Andreoli and Ricardo Confessori, and voice actor Gilberto Baroli. In 2013 he published through Edições Ideal the book A Bíblia do Heavy Metal – O Antigo Testamento, co-authored alongside Rafael Rosa. In 2015 he released the extended play DetonaThor to promote the MOBA video game Smite, for which he voiced Thor in its Portuguese dub. In 2017 he provided narration for another MOBA video game, Heavy Metal Machines. On December 18, 2020, his second full-length release with Detonator e as Musas do Metal, the Christmas album Metal Metalino, came out unannounced, featuring parodies of Christmas carols with a heavy metal twist. The band's third studio album, Arraiá do Metal, was released on June 7, 2021, this time featuring parodies of traditional Festa Junina songs.

He also served as vocalist of cover band The Soundtrackers, and released solo albums under his true name of Bruno Sutter, the first of which having its production crowdfunded via a successful Kickante campaign; it reached R$42,005.00, surpassing its originally intended goal of R$40,000.00. In 2016 he returned to perform with Massacration, but is no longer an official member of Hermes & Renato.

In 2015 he was chosen by voice actor  to perform the Brazilian Portuguese version of Dragon Ball Supers third ending song, "Usubeni", originally by Lacco Tower. From 2018 to 2019 he was a judge for RecordTV's singing competition Canta Comigo, returning to its preteen-oriented spin-off Canta Comigo Teen, which premiered in 2020.

On June 28, 2022, Sutter was announced as a contestant of the second season of RecordTV's reality show Ilha Record.

Personal life

From 2014 to 2019 Sutter was engaged to actress, television presenter and digital influencer , twelve years his younger; they met in the mid-2000s, while shooting Hermes & Renato sketches for MTV Brasil, and Estephan has made countless cameos throughout the show's original 1999–2010 run. Minor controversy arose when Estephan began dating YouTuber  soon after their engagement was terminated, making their relationship official on June 12, 2020. In August 2020 he began a relationship with model, singer and fellow Canta Comigo judge Talita Dias.

He was previously married to veterinarian Adriane Cristina Sutter.

Discography
Massacration
 2005 – Gates of Metal Fried Chicken of Death
 2009 – Good Blood Headbanguers
 2017 – Live Metal Espancation (live album)

Detonator
 2014 – Metal Folclore: The Zoeira Never Ends...
 2015 – Live InSana (live album)
 2015 – DetonaThor (EP)
 2020 – Metal Metalino
 2021 – Arraiá do Metal

Solo
 2015 – Bruno Sutter
 2017 – Alive in Hell (live album)

Bibliography
 A Bíblia do Heavy Metal – O Antigo Testamento (Edições Ideal, 2013; co-written by Rafael Rosa)

References

External links
 
 
 

1979 births
Living people
Brazilian humorists
Brazilian parodists
Brazilian male television actors
20th-century Brazilian male actors
21st-century Brazilian male actors
21st-century Brazilian male singers
21st-century Brazilian singers
Brazilian male singer-songwriters
Brazilian heavy metal singers
Brazilian bass guitarists
Male bass guitarists
English-language singers from Brazil
Brazilian record producers
Brazilian writers
Brazilian YouTubers
People from Petrópolis
Parody musicians